Novaj is a village in Heves County, Northern Hungary Region, Hungary.

Sights to visit
    church

References

Populated places in Heves County